Pedinogyra rotabilis is a species of air-breathing land snail, a terrestrial pulmonate gastropod mollusc in the family Caryodidae.

Distribution 
This species is endemic to Australia.

References

External links

 https://biodiversity.org.au/afd/taxa/Tetraponera

Caryodidae
Gastropods described in 1852